The term patternmaking may refer to:
 The making of patterns for casting
 The making of patterns for sewing